Green Helmet or Green Helmets may refer to

Salam Daher a Lebanese civil defense worker, labelled as "The Green Helmet"
The Green Helmet, 1961 British film
Peacekeepers from African nations when operating under the auspices of the African Union